The 2017 season is Balestier Khalsa's 22nd consecutive season in the top flight of Singapore football and in the S.League. Along with the S.League, the club will also compete in the Prime League, the Singapore Cup and the Singapore League Cup.

Squad

S.League squad

Coaching staff

Transfer

Pre-season transfers
Source

In

Out

Mid-season transfers

In

Out

Friendlies

Pre-season friendlies

In Season Friendlies

Team statistics

Appearances and goals

Numbers in parentheses denote appearances as substitute.

Competitions

Overview

S.League

Singapore Cup

Singapore TNP League Cup

References

Balestier Khalsa FC seasons
Singaporean football clubs 2017 season